Chanao I or Canao, son of king Waroch I, was king of Vannetais in 550–560. Chanao claimed power over the whole south of Breton Armorica and used political assassination to achieve his ends.

Biography
Chanao was the brother of Macliau, bishop of Vannes. He killed three of his brothers to ensure complete control of the throne. Macliau, the last survivor, was the prisoner of his brother, who wanted to kill him as well. Felix, bishop of Nantes, was able to release him on the condition that he swear allegiance. Chanao, learning that his brother wanted to break his oath, pursued him again. Macliau, powerless, fled to Conomor, another regional count.

6th-century Breton people
Armorica